Lourdes is a settlement in the Alto Paraguay Department of Paraguay.

References

Populated places in the Alto Paraguay Department